Koren is a surname and given name.

Koren may also refer to:
 Koren Publishers Jerusalem, Israeli publishing house
 Koren Specific Technique, a controversial new age chiropractic technique
 Koren Type, Hebrew font
 Koren (village), a village in Bulgaria
 Corno di Rosazzo, or Koren, a commune of Italy
 Wurzenpass or Koren, a mountain pass on the border of Austria and Slovenia

See also 
 Coren